Batwoman is a name used by several characters of DC Comics, both in mainstream continuity and Elseworlds. The best known Batwomen are Kathy Kane and Kate Kane.

History
 The first Batwoman, Kathy Kane, debuted during the Silver Age of Comics within the "pre-crisis" mainstream DC Universe. 
 The 1996 limited series Kingdom Come by Mark Waid and Alex Ross presents a Batwoman portrayed as a Batman admirer from Jack Kirby's Fourth World. Her costume mixed Kirby-esque elements with those of the original costume. The character rode a giant bat-winged dog named Ace.
 Batman: Dark Knight Dynasty (1997) features Vice-President Brenna Wayne who becomes Batwoman to stop Vandal Savage. Wayne discovers a conspiracy against her family after investigating the last thirteen generations of the Wayne family.
 JLA: The Nail (1998) by Alan Davis features Selina Kyle adopting a Batwoman costume based on the costume worn by Kathy Kane. The 2004 sequel, JLA: Another Nail, features her fashioning her own Batwoman persona.
 Superman/Batman #24 (November 2005) presents a world where the genders of the characters are reversed with Helena Wayne as Batwoman. DC later placed this alternate reality as "Earth 11" in the post-Infinite Crisis multiverse.

 Kate Kane as Batwoman debuted in 2006 in the series 52.
 In the Teen Titans storyline "Titans Tomorrow" (2005), Bette Kane is Batwoman, and wears a costume similar to Kathy's pre-Crisis one. In the follow up storyline, "Titans of Tomorrow... Today!" (2007), Bette Kane remains Flamebird and former Batgirl Cassandra Cain becomes Batwoman.
 In DC Comics Bombshells, which take place in an alternate history version of World War II, there are three versions of the character outside of Kate Kane:
 Katherine Webb, a member of the Kane family and the aunt to both Kate and Bette, is the Headmistress of Pinkney Orphanage. She was left in charge of the orphanage by Kate before she left Gotham. Headmistress Webb is a xenophobic woman, who uses the orphans to make robots to protect the country from foreigners, whom she characterizes as evil. She is later defeated by a team of Batgirls, including Bette, who come to the orphanage to save the orphans.
 Kathleen "Kathy" Duquesne, an auto mechanic and the leader of a team of Batgirls, who protect the city during Batwoman's absence. Along with Kathy, the team includes Nell Little, Harper Row and later on Alysia Yeoh and Bette Kane. Upon meeting Bette, Kathy immediately recognizes her as a baseball player and later figures out her real identity as well as her connection to Batwoman but promises to keep it a secret. The Batgirls save the orphans of Pinkney Orphanage from the devious Headmistress and later expand their team, welcoming Tim Drake, Cullen Row and Felicity Smoak, and creating a Bat family.
 Sonia Alcana appears as an officer of Gotham City Police Department, partnered with Crispus Allen and working with Maggie Sawyer to aid Batwoman into her fight against crime in the city.
 In the 2019 Young Justice series, Stephanie Brown is the Batwoman of Earth-3.

In other media

Television
 A loose adaptation of Batwoman appears in the Batman: The Brave and the Bold episode "The Criss Cross Conspiracy!", voiced by Vanessa Marshall. This version is visually based on the Kathy Kane incarnation, but is depicted as series original character Katrina Moldoff / The Bat Lady, thrill-seeking heiress to the Moldoff Circus fortune and a trained circus acrobat whose crime-fighting style endangers bystanders. After being publicly unmasked and humiliated by the Riddler years prior, she is forced to give up her crime-fighting lifestyle before seeking revenge in the present by encouraging Felix Faust to give her a spell to switch her and Batman's bodies, allowing her to get closer to the Riddler without the police coming after her. After she fails, Batman rescues her and convinces Faust to switch them back before she quietly turns herself into the police. Series director Ben Jones confirmed that the decision to rename the character was brought about after DC Comics voiced concerns about this depiction of the character having a negative impact on the new Batwoman comic book series, the first issue of which launched less than a month after the episode's initial air date.
 The Kate Kane incarnation of Batwoman and her successor, series original character Ryan Wilder, appear in a self-titled TV series, portrayed by Ruby Rose and Javicia Leslie respectively. Leslie also portrays an alternate timeline version of Ryan known as Red Death in the ninth and final season of The Flash as the antagonist of the first graphic novel of the season.

Film
Batwoman appears in Batman: Mystery of the Batwoman, voiced by Kyra Sedgwick. This version is an identity used by three people: Gotham Police Detective Sonia Alcana (voiced by Elisa Gabrielli), Wayne Tech employee Dr. Roxanne "Rocky" Ballantine (voiced by Kelly Ripa), and Kathleen "Kathy" Duquesne (voiced by Kimberly Brooks), who all hold grudges against the Penguin and Rupert Thorne as well as Carlton Duquesne, a gangster in the crime bosses' employ and Kathy's father. Alcana, Ballantine, and Kathy pooled their resources and skills together to seek revenge while taking turns operating as Batwoman to draw suspicion away from each other, with all three using lethal force to achieve their goals. In the DVD and Blu-ray special features, the producers explained that DC did not want the filmmakers to use Kate Kane in a family-friendly film due to the violence associated with her character.

See also
 Batgirl
 Robin
 Huntress (DC Comics)

References

Articles about multiple fictional characters
Batman characters code names
DC Comics female superheroes
Characters created by Bob Kane
Characters created by Edmond Hamilton
Characters created by Geoff Johns
Characters created by Grant Morrison
Characters created by Greg Rucka
Characters created by Keith Giffen
Characters created by Mark Waid
Characters created by Sheldon Moldoff